Kiss and Make-Up is a 1934 romantic comedy film starring Cary Grant as a doctor who specializes in making women beautiful. Genevieve Tobin and Helen Mack play his romantic entanglements. All of the WAMPAS Baby Stars of 1934 were cast in roles in the film.

Plot
Dr. Maurice Lamar runs a highly successful business in Paris, providing cosmetic surgery and other beauty treatments to women. Old friend Max Pascal visits him to try to borrow money to finish his research, but Maurice turns him down, instead offering him a job, and later a partnership. Max declines.

Maurice unveils the new Eve Caron and declares her perfect. However, her husband Marcel only wants a wife just a bit beautiful, not someone who attracts the attention of every man, so he divorces her. Maurice then marries her himself.

They go to a beauty convention on the Riviera on their honeymoon, accompanied by Maurice's naturally pretty secretary Annie, who secretly yearns for him. However, Eve is so careful about guarding her beauty that all the restrictions she imposes on herself irritate her new husband. Eve takes so long getting ready that they miss the banquet in his honor.

While swimming, Annie meets an appreciative Marcel Caron. They go on a date, and Annie admires Marcel's curly hair. When Marcel later runs into Maurice at a nightclub, he is delighted when he correctly guesses what Eve has put Maurice through, as he had to put up with the same behavior himself.

The honeymoon night turns out to be a disaster. First, Eve complains that she has run out of "cleansing cream" and insists that Annie bring her some more. After Annie brings some, the secretary becomes upset and quits, and Maurice cannot understand why. When Maurice sees Eve ready for bed, with cleansing cream on her face and wearing a hairnet and gloves, he gets himself first another room, then a divorce.

Maurice returns to Paris, only to find his business in shambles without Annie to manage things. He decides to quit cosmetics and conduct research with Max. Annie shows up and informs Maurice that she is going to marry Marcel. Maurice then realizes that he loves Annie. He chases after the couple in a taxi. They both crash. Annie then discovers to her horror that Marcel's curly hair is a toupee. After giving Maurice's hair a good tug, she tells him she loves him.

Cast
Cary Grant as Dr. Maurice Lamar
Genevieve Tobin as Eve Caron
Helen Mack as Annie
Edward Everett Horton as Marcel Caron
Lucien Littlefield as Max Pascal
Mona Maris as Countess Rita
Rafael Alcayde as Rolando (credited as Rafael Storm)
Toby Wing as Consuelo Claghorne
Dorothy Christie as Greta

Listed in the opening credits are "The WAMPAS Baby Stars of 1934":
Judith Arlen
Betty Bryson
Jean Carmen
Helen Cohan (credited as Helene Cohan)
Dorothy Drake
Jean Gale
Hazel Hayes
Ann Hovey
Lucille Lund
Lu Ann Meredith (as Lu-Anne Meredith)
Gigi Parrish (as Gi-Gi Parrish)
Jacqueline Wells
Katherine Williams

Reception
Andre Sennwald of The New York Times labelled the film a "first-class lingerie bazaar and a third-class entertainment, though he thought that Grant had brought much liveliness to the part.  Winthrop Sargent of Variety thought that Grant performed well as the doctor, but was of the opinion that he and Horton overplayed their parts "too strongly for laughs". Pauline Kael later praised Grant's performance and thought that he had used his skills developed in vaudeville to good use in the film, displaying a "sense of fun" with "confident, full-hearted exhibitionism".

References

Sources

External links

1934 films
1934 romantic comedy films
American black-and-white films
American films based on plays
American romantic comedy films
Films produced by B. P. Schulberg
Films set in Paris
Films set on the French Riviera
Works about plastic surgery
1930s American films